Aeria may refer to:
 Aeria Games and Entertainment
 Aeria (genus), a nymphalid butterfly genus in the tribe Ithomiini
 369 Aëria, a large main belt asteroid discovered on July 4, 1893